The 2018 Supersport 300 World Championship was the second season of the Supersport 300 World Championship of motorcycle racing.

The season was won by Ana Carrasco who became the first female rider in history to win a World Championship in solo motorcycle road racing.

Race calendar and results

Entry list

All entries used Pirelli tyres.

Championship standings
Points were awarded as follows:

Riders' championship

Bold – Pole positionItalics – Fastest lap

Manufacturers' championship

References

External links 
Official website

Superbike
Supersport 300 World Championship seasons